Kantipur City College is a college in Putalisadak in Kathmandu city, the capital of Nepal. It was established in 2000, and is affiliated with Purbanchal University. Kantipur City College has 852 students.
Kantipur City College (KCC) provides education mainly on technical subjects.

Subjects

School of Science and Technology

BCABCA HonorsMCA

BIT

School of Engineering

BE (Civil)

BE (Computer)

BE (Elex.)

School of Management

BBA

School of Arts and Humanities

MA/MCJ

External links
Kantipur City College

Schools in Nepal
Educational institutions established in 2000
2000 establishments in Nepal